James Milton Riggs (April 17, 1839 – November 18, 1933) was a U.S. Representative from Illinois, United States.

Born on a farm near Winchester, Illinois, Riggs attended the common schools and Eureka College (Illinois) in 1862 and 1863.
He engaged in agricultural pursuits and taught school.
Sheriff of Scott County from December 1, 1864, to December 1, 1866.
He studied law.
He was admitted to the bar December 28, 1867, and commenced practice in Winchester, Illinois.
Secretary of the Winchester School Board 1868-1884 and served as president 1889-1892. (That district is now part of Winchester Community Unit School District 1.)
He served as member of the Illinois House of Representatives in 1871 and 1872.
State's attorney for Scott County 1872-1876.
He served as mayor of Winchester in 1876 and 1877.
He was elected as a Democrat to the Forty-eighth and Forty-ninth Congresses (March 4, 1883 – March 3, 1887).
He was not a candidate for renomination in 1886.
He resumed the practice of law in Winchester, Illinois.
He served as president of the Illinois State Bar Association in 1891.
He served as delegate to several State conventions.
He was elected judge of Scott County in 1922.
He was reelected in 1926 and served until 1930 when he retired from active pursuits.
He died in Winchester, Illinois, November 18, 1933.
He was interred in Winchester Cemetery.

References

1839 births
1933 deaths
Eureka College alumni
Illinois state court judges
Mayors of places in Illinois
Democratic Party members of the Illinois House of Representatives
School board members in Illinois
District attorneys in Illinois
People from Winchester, Illinois
Democratic Party members of the United States House of Representatives from Illinois